Attersyn is the fourth EP released by the Norwegian band Gåte.

Track listing

References

2017 EPs
Gåte albums